NHS Supply Chain supports the National Health Service (NHS) in England, and other healthcare organisations in England and Wales, by providing procurement and logistics services.

History
In February 2016, Lord Carter's report into efficiency and productivity identified unwarranted variation in procurement across the NHS. Following this report, a "new operating model" for NHS Supply Chain was established. The design of a new supply chain service was planned to help the NHS deliver clinically assured, quality products at the best value through a range of specialist buying functions, and leverage the buying power of the NHS to negotiate the best deals from suppliers, with the aim to deliver savings of £2.4 billion over five years.

Oversight and operational management of the new operating model are by Supply Chain Coordination Limited, a company wholly owned by the Secretary of State for Health and Social Care, which began operations in April 2018. Services were transferred to the new model in stages during 2018 and early 2019. Over 200 staff were transferred from DHL Supply Chain and NHS Business Services Authority to the new company. Some elements of the NHS Purchase and Supply Agency were also transferred to the new organisation.

Until April 2019, the contract to run the service was managed from 2006 by DHL Supply Chain on behalf of the NHS Business Services Authority. Earlier, the organisation was called NHS Logistics Authority and then NHS Logistics. In July 2018, logistical control of the supply chain was passed from DHL Supply Chain to Unipart.

In February 2018, NHS Supply Chain notified all its NHS clients that Mondelez International, owners of Cadbury chocolate, had been 'delisted' after the company put up its prices, which the agency was "not prepared to accept ... on behalf of [its] customers".

Jin Sahota the chief executive resigned in September 2020, shortly after the Department of Health and Social Care and the Cabinet Office announced a review of the agency following the crisis in the supply of personal protective equipment.

A four-tiered demand management system to “maintain continuity of supply of critical products to the NHS where normal supply is disrupted” was established in response to the persistent problems in global supply chains that began with the rise of covid in March 2020.  In August 2022 it was reported that 271 products were in the two most stringent levels of rationing, including dressings, tracheostomy tubes, products for epidurals, blood collection equipment and ventilators for sleep therapy. 

In April 2022 it took over responsibility for the Department of Health and Social Care’s Personal Protective Equipment programme.

Locations

The organisation has a number of warehouses:
Somercotes, Derbyshire (head office)
Bridgwater, Somerset
Bury St Edmunds, Suffolk
Maidstone, Kent
Normanton, West Yorkshire
Rugby, Warwickshire
Runcorn, Cheshire

There are three office sites:
Bracknell, Berkshire
Chester, Cheshire
Annesley, Nottinghamshire
Leeds, West Yorkshire

References

External links

National Health Service (England)
2006 establishments in England
Government agencies established in 2006
Organisations based in Derbyshire
Government procurement in the United Kingdom